Austbø is a Norwegian surname. Notable people with the surname include:

 Fredrik Austbø (born 1988), Norwegian snowboarder
 Håkon Austbø (born 1948), Norwegian pianist
 Iven Austbø (born 1985), Norwegian footballer
 Johan Austbø, Norwegian teacher

Norwegian-language surnames